Albert William Puddy (December 19, 1916 – June 23, 1999) was a competition swimmer who represented Canada in international swimming events during the 1930s.  At the 1934 British Empire Games in London, he won a gold medal as a member of the first-place Canadian team in the 3x110-yard medley relay, and a bronze medal in the 200-yard breaststroke.  He also swam in the 200-metre breaststroke at the 1936 Summer Olympics in Berlin, Germany, but did not advance beyond the first round.

See also
 List of Commonwealth Games medallists in swimming (men)

References

1916 births
1999 deaths
Swimmers from Toronto
Canadian male breaststroke swimmers
Olympic swimmers of Canada
Swimmers at the 1936 Summer Olympics
Swimmers at the 1934 British Empire Games
Commonwealth Games medallists in swimming
Commonwealth Games gold medallists for Canada
Commonwealth Games bronze medallists for Canada
Medallists at the 1934 British Empire Games